Ivan Krastev (born 1965 in Lukovit, Bulgaria), is a political scientist, the chairman of the Centre for Liberal Strategies in Sofia, permanent fellow at the IWM (Institute of Human Sciences) in Vienna, and 2013-4-17 Richard von Weizsäcker fellow at the Robert Bosch Stiftung in Berlin.

He is a founding board member of the European Council on Foreign Relations, a member of the board of trustees of the International Crisis Group and is a contributing opinion writer for The New York Times.

From 2004 to 2006 Krastev was executive director of the International Commission on the Balkans chaired by the former Italian Prime Minister Giuliano Amato. He was Editor-in-Chief of the Bulgarian Edition of Foreign Policy and was a member of the Council of the International Institute for Strategic Studies, London (2005-2011).  Since 2016, he serves as a director/trustee of the School of Civic Education in London , which forms part of an association of schools of political studies, under the auspices of the Directorate General of Democracy (“DGII”) of the Council of Europe

His books in English include Shifting Obsessions: Three Essays on the Politics of Anticorruption (CEU Press, 2004), The Anti-American Century, co-edited with Alan McPherson, (CEU Press, 2007), In Mistrust We Trust: Can Democracy Survive When We Don't Trust Our Leaders, (TED Books, 2013), Democracy Disrupted. The Politics of Global Protest (UPenn Press, May 2014) and After Europe (UPenn Press, 2017). He is a co-author with Stephen Holmes of the book The Light that Failed on East European politics.

Bibliography
 Shifting Obsessions: Three Essays on the Politics of Anticorruption, CEU Press, 2004.
 The Anti-American Century, Alan McPherson and Ivan Krastev (eds.), CEU Press, 2007.
 Europe's Democracy Paradox, The American Interest, March/April 2012.
 In Mistrust We Trust: Can Democracy Survive When We Don't Trust Our Leaders?, TED books, 3 January 2013
 Democracy Disrupted, Penn University Press, 2014
 After Europe, Penn University Press, 2017
 The Light that Failed: A Reckoning, co-authored with Stephen Holmes, Penguin, 2019
 Is It Tomorrow Yet?: Paradoxes of the Pandemic, 2020, Allen Lane, (96 pages)

References

External links
 Ivan Krastev TED talk
 
 A full list of Ivan Krastev publications

1965 births
Living people
People from Lukovit
Bulgarian political scientists
Foreign policy writers
Populism scholars